Callirhytis quercusfutilis, the oak wart gall wasp, is a species of gall wasp in the family Cynipidae.

Ecology
Range is central and eastern North America.

The agamic generation lives in the scurfy bark of a host white oak tree root or trunk base.

Host species include white oak, swamp white oak, overcup oak, bur oak, swamp chestnut oak, chestnut oak, dwarf chinkapin oak, and post oak.

The sexual generation induces galls on host white oak leaves, between leaf veins and projecting slightly above both surfaces of the leaf.

Internally, thin radiating fibers connect the larval chamber to the wall of the gall, providing the larva with nutrients supplied by the host.

References

External links

Cynipidae
Gall-inducing insects
Oak galls
Taxa named by Carl Robert Osten-Sacken
Species described in 1861